The 2016 New South Wales Swifts season saw New South Wales Swifts compete in the 2016 ANZ Championship. Swifts finished the regular season in second place in the Australian Conference. In the play-offs, they defeated Melbourne Vixens and Waikato Bay of Plenty Magic but lost twice to Queensland Firebirds, including 69–67 in the grand final.

Players

Player movements

2016 roster

Debutants
 Laura Langman made her Swifts debut in a preseason friendly against Waikato Bay of Plenty Magic. 
 Lauren Moore, Amy Sommerville and Maddy Turner made their Swifts and ANZ Championship debuts in Round 1 against Melbourne Vixens.   
 Kaitlyn Bryce made her Swifts and ANZ Championship debut in Round 2 against Waikato Bay of Plenty Magic.

Regular season
In Round 6, Swifts defeated Central Pulse 79–41. This was both the Swifts highest ever score and their largest winning margin. In Round 9, they hosted Queensland Firebirds at the Qudos Bank Arena in front of 13,314 fans, one of the largest crowds attendance in the history of the ANZ Championship. Swifts maintained an undefeated record at Sydney Olympic Park Sports Centre which contributed to their ten wins, two losses and one draw during the regular season.

Fixtures and results

Final standings

Play-offs

Elimination Final
Australian Conference

Conference Finals
Australian Conference

Semi-final

Grand Final

Award winners

References

New South Wales Swifts seasons
New South Wales Swifts